Franco Bontadini (4 January 1893 – 27 January 1943) was an Italian amateur footballer who played as a midfielder. He competed with the Italy national football team in the 1912 Summer Olympics.

Career
At club level, Bontadini played for Calcio Ausonia, Milan, and Inter. At international level, Bontadini was also a member of the Italian Olympic squad in 1912 and played one match in the main tournament as well as two matches in the consolation tournament. He scored one goal in each tournament.

References

External links
profile

1893 births
1943 deaths
Italian footballers
Inter Milan players
Italy international footballers
Olympic footballers of Italy
Footballers at the 1912 Summer Olympics
Association football midfielders